Mobile, Texas is a ghost town in Crockett County, Texas. It maintained a post office between 1880 and 1881.

References

Crockett County, Texas
Ghost towns in Texas